Albești (meaning the "White (Village)" in Romanian) is a commune in Constanța County, Northern Dobruja, Romania.

The commune includes five villages:
 Albești (historical names:  and Sarighiol)
 Arsa (historical name: Capucci)
 Coroana (historical names: Cadichioi)
 Cotu Văii (historical names: Chiragi or Ciragi)
 Vârtop (historical name: Deliorucci)

Demographics
At the 2011 census, Albești had 3,154 Romanians (97.05%), 3  Hungarians (0.09%), 4 Roma  (0.12%), 5 Turks (0.15%), 80 Tatars (2.46%), 4 others (0.12%).

References

Communes in Constanța County
Localities in Northern Dobruja